Stuart or Stewart Robertson may refer to:

Stuart A. Robertson (1918–2005), co-founder of Milliman, Inc., an actuarial and business consulting firm
Stuart Robertson (gardener) (1944–2009), professional gardener from Montreal, Quebec
Stuart Robertson (footballer, born 1946), English footballer who played centre half
Stuart Robertson (cricketer) (born 1947), former Zimbabwean first class cricketer
Stewart Robertson (born 1948), Scottish composer
Stuart Robertson (footballer, born 1959), Scottish footballer who played in the Football League and the Scottish Football League
Stuart Robertson (photographer) (born 1969), New Zealand photographer

See also
 Robertson (surname)